Chris Black (born 17 February 1978 in Dundee, Scotland) is a former Scotland Under 19 international rugby union player who played for Glasgow Warriors at the Scrum-half position.

Black started out playing rugby union with Dundee HSFP.

He then moved to Watsonians.

He was called into the Glasgow Warriors squad for the season 2000-01. He played in the Pro12 and in the Heineken Cup for the club. When not in use with the provincial side he turned out for Boroughmuir. He was released by Glasgow in 2003, after an injury-hit season.

Black later joined Morgan Academy RFC.

Black now works in the oil industry as the Chief Operating Officer for JAB recruitment. He now stays in Carnoustie and coaches his local rugby team.

References

External links
Pro12 Profile
Statbunker Profile
EPCR Profile

1978 births
Living people
Boroughmuir RFC players
Dundee HSFP players
Glasgow Warriors players
Morgan Rugby players
Rugby union players from Dundee
Scottish rugby union players
Watsonians RFC players
Rugby union scrum-halves